Century was an American metalcore band formed in 2005 by multi-instrumentalist/ArmsBendBack guitarist Carson Slovak. Century was originally conceived as a solo project, but later evolved into a complete band. Slovak writes all of Century's music, and designs all of the artwork and merchandise. In 2005 the band signed a contract with Tribunal Records. On February 7, 2006, Century released its first studio album, Faith and Failure through Tribunal Records. This album saw Carson Slovak as guitarist and producer joined by Mike Guiliano (guitar), Huggie (bass) and Grant McFarland (drums). Before the album was released, McFarland left to focus more on his current band This or the Apocalypse and was replaced by new drummer Matthew Smith.

In February 2009, it was announced that McFarland had rejoined the band, along with new additions: bassist Ricky Armellino (also of This or the Apocalypse), and  additional guitarist Todd Mogle.  The band has begun work on the follow-up to Black Ocean, which was released in April 2008.

On March 9, 2010, the band posted a cover of Seal's "Kiss from a Rose" on their Myspace page and announced that they would be working on a new album scheduled to be released later in 2010.

Their third studio album, titled Red Giant, was released on August 30, 2011. It featured Candlebox singer Kevin Martin on the track, "Oak God".

Members

Current members
 Carson Slovak – vocals
 Jason Baker – guitar
 Todd Mogle – guitar
 Ricky Armellino - bass
 Grant McFarland – drums

Discography

Studio albums

Extended plays

Videography

Music videos

References

External links
Century at MySpace
Century at Prosthetic Records
[ Century] at Allmusic

Metalcore musical groups from Pennsylvania
Heavy metal musical groups from Pennsylvania
Musical groups established in 2005
American post-hardcore musical groups